Madeleine Collinson (22 July 1952 – 14 August 2014) was a Maltese-British model and actress. She was chosen as Playboy magazine's Playmate of the Month in October 1970, together with her twin sister Mary Collinson. They were the first identical twin Playmates.

Career
The Collinson twins first arrived in Britain in April 1969, and prior to their appearance in Playboy one of the first people to use them was the glamour photographer/film maker Harrison Marks who cast them as saucy maids in his short film Halfway Inn. The film, made for the 8mm market, was shot sometime between their British arrival, and July 1970, when a still from the film was used in a Marks advertisement that ran in that month's issue of Continental Film Review magazine. 
   
Both sisters went on to acting careers, mostly in B-movies. Madeleine married a British Royal Air Force officer and raised three children. She later moved back to Malta and was involved in cultural and educational activities there. In her final years, Madeleine Collinson lived in San Gwann, Malta.

Death 
After several months of illness from advanced emphysema, she died at Mater Dei Hospital in Msida on 14 August 2014, following an electrical blackout which had stopped her ventilator two days earlier. Her twin sister Mary was present for her death.

Filmography
 Come Back Peter (1969)
 Permissive (1970)
 Groupie Girl (1970)
 She'll Follow You Anywhere (1971)
 The Love Machine (1971)
 Twins of Evil (a.k.a. Twins of Dracula) 1971)

Notable TV guest appearances
 The Tonight Show Starring Johnny Carson 16 September 1970

Magazine appearances
 Impact '70 magazine 1970 Vol. 1. No 1 "Double Exposure" photo story made up of stills from 'Halfway Inn'.
 Cinema X magazine 1972 Vol.4 No.3 "Those Curvy Collinsons meet The Love Machine"
 Titbits magazine 11 July 1973 "Which Twin has the Twinge"

See also
 List of people in Playboy 1970–79

References

External links
 
 

1952 births
2014 deaths
People from Sliema
British actresses
1970s Playboy Playmates
British film actresses
British television actresses
Identical twin actresses
British identical twins
Maltese twins
Maltese actresses
Twin models